Salisbury Island is one of the uninhabited Canadian arctic islands in the Qikiqtaaluk Region, Nunavut.

References

Islands of Baffin Island
Islands of Hudson Strait
Uninhabited islands of Qikiqtaaluk Region